The Erath County Courthouse is a historic courthouse in Stephenville, Texas. It is listed on the National Register of Historic Places.

History 
The first courthouse in Erath County was built in 1856. It was wooden and burned down in 1866. A second courthouse made of stone was built in 1887 was demolished in 1891 to make room for the third and current courthouse.

The third and current courthouse was designed by James Riely Gordon in a Richardsonian Romanesque style. Construction started on December 3, 1891 and the courthouse was finished on October 20, 1892.

The courthouse was remodelled in 1950.

The building was added to the National Register of Historic Places in 1977.

The building was restored in 1988.

Description 
The courthouse was constructed with local white limestone and red Pecos sandstone.

See also 
 National Register of Historic Places listings in Erath County, Texas

References 

National Register of Historic Places in Erath County, Texas
County courthouses in Texas
Courthouses on the National Register of Historic Places in Texas
Buildings and structures completed in 1892